Alejandro Rodríguez de Valcárcel y Nebreda (25 December 1917 – 22 October 1976) was a Spanish falangist politician and State lawyer, who served in important positions during the dictatorship of Francisco Franco.

Biography 
Born in December 1917 in Burgos to a bourgeois family, he joined the Sindicato Español Universitario (SEU) in 1934. A camisa vieja Falangist, he entered the Civil War as volunteer in a Bandera of Falange.

From 27 November 1969 to 5 December 1975 he served as the President of the Francoist Cortes.

In the capacity of President of the Council of Regency, he briefly served as acting Head of State, from Franco's death on 20 November to 22 November 1975, when then Prince Juan Carlos took an oath and was proclaimed King of Spain.

He died on 22 October 1976 in the Ciudad Sanitaria La Paz in Madrid. His corpse was buried at the San José cemetery in Burgos. On 5 January 1977 he was posthumously bestowed the nobiliary title of Count of Rodríguez de Valcárcel.

Notes

References

Citations

Sources 

 
 
 
 
 

1917 births
1976 deaths
FET y de las JONS politicians
Francoist Spain
Regents of Spain
People from Burgos
University of Salamanca alumni
Presidents of the Congress of Deputies (Spain)
Members of the State Lawyers Corps